Panama City Airport may refer to:

 Tocumen International Airport (PTY/MPTO), the main international airport serving Panama City, Panama
 Albrook "Marcos A. Gelabert" International Airport (PAC/MPMG), a smaller domestic airport serving Panama City, Panama
 Northwest Florida Beaches International Airport (ECP/KECP), serving Panama City, Florida, United States
 Panama City–Bay County International Airport, former airport in Florida replaced by ECP/KECP